The Environmental Law Alliance Worldwide (ELAW) is a public interest, nonprofit, environmental organization that helps communities protect the environment and public health through law. ELAW helps partners strengthen and enforce laws to protect themselves and their communities from toxic pollution and environmental degradation.  ELAW provides legal and scientific tools and support that local advocates need to challenge environmental abuses.

History 
ELAW was founded in 1989 by lawyers from Australia, Canada, Chile, Ecuador, Indonesia, Malaysia, Peru, the Philippines, Sri Lanka, and the United States.  The founders were gathered at the University of Oregon's Public Interest Environmental Law Conference.  ELAW's U.S. office is in Eugene, Oregon.

Grants 
ELAW has received grants from the MacArthur Foundation and the Charles Stewart Mott Foundation for projects in conservation and sustainable development.

See also 

Biodiversity
Earth Science
Ecology
Global warming
Natural environment
Recycling
Sustainability

References

External links
 

Environmental organizations based in the United States
Legal organizations based in the United States